37 Geminorum is a solitary Sun-like star located at the northwest part of the northern constellation of Gemini, about three degrees to the east of the bright star Epsilon Geminorum. The apparent visual magnitude of 37 Geminorum is 5.74, which is just bright enough to be visible to the naked eye on a dark night. It is located at a distance of 57 light years from the Sun based on parallax. It is positioned close enough to the ecliptic to be subject to lunar occultations, such as happened on April 8, 1984.

The stellar classification of 37 Geminorum is G0 V, which indicates it is an ordinary G-type main sequence star that is generating energy through core hydrogen fusion. In 2007, J. C. Hall and associates categorized it as a solar-type with a high mean activity level. The star is around 5.5 billion years old and is spinning with a rotation period of 25 days. It is slightly larger and more massive than the Sun, with a lower abundance of heavier elements based on its abundance of iron. 37 Geminorum is radiating 1.3 times the luminosity of the Sun from its photosphere at an effective temperature of 6,060 K.

As of 2012, no extrasolar planets or debris disks have yet been discovered around it.

Teen Age Message

There was a METI message sent to 37 Geminorum. It was transmitted from Eurasia's largest radar, 70-meter Yevpatoria Planetary Radar. The message was named the Teen Age Message, it was sent on September 3, 2001, and it will arrive at 37 Geminorum in December 2057.

Catalog of Nearby Habitable Systems

The Catalog of Nearby Habitable Systems (HabCat) is a list of approximately 17,000 relatively close stars similar to the sun and considered able to support a planet habitable by humans.  37 Geminorum is on the HabCat list.

See also 
 18 Scorpii

References

External links
 
 HabCat A Catalog of Nearby Habitable Systems

G-type main-sequence stars
Gemini (constellation)
Durchmusterung objects
Geminorum, 37
0252
050692
033277
2569